The term Primitive Catholic is used by a small but growing number of Christians, both in established Church bodies as well as in independent Christian congregations.  The groups that are so described, see themselves as restoring or revisiting the practices of the ancient Christian Church, but doing so in a more "catholic" fashion than most other Christian Primitivists / Restorationists.

While both Primitive Catholics and other Christian Primitivists / Restorationists would agree that the early Church is a normative model which should serve as a pattern for emulation by all Christians and all Churches throughout all ages, Primitive Catholics differ from most other Christian Primitivists / Restorationists in several areas, including, most foundationally, what they view as sources of authority. While most who would identify as Christian Primitivists / Restorationists, come from a Protestant background, and embrace the Protestant doctrine of Sola Scriptura, recognizing only the authority of Scripture, Primitive Catholics, on the other hand, also recognize the authority of oral Apostolic tradition (in lieu of Holy Scripture), which they believe is best preserved in the writings of the Ante-Nicene Fathers. Most congregations and ecclesiastical bodies that use the term are Trinitarian in orientation, and appear to reject at least some elements of the Western doctrine of original sin (though some openly adhere to the Eastern form of the doctrine).  All believe in the Real Presence of Christ in the Eucharist, and hold to some form of liturgy. In general, in as much as it is possible today, Primitive Catholics aspire to live in the spirit of the Christian faith as it existed in the catholic (or "universal") church of the apostolic era and first few centuries thereafter, before the Christian religion became intertwined with the state. While no central book exists within the movement, the early Christian pre-Nicene writings are regarded as especially relevant within Primitive Catholic theology. Minimizing dogmatism and ecclesiastical bureaucracy, Primitive Catholics would by and large accept the famous, much later Catholic aphorism attributed to Marco Antonio de Dominis, “In necessariis unitas, in dubiis libertas, in omnibus caritas” (which is commonly phrased and loosely translates as "in essential things unity; in non-essential things liberty; in all things charity“). 
 
Assemblies meet in a variety of settings, including established congregations, house churches, cell groups, and group Bible studies.  Some of these models operate in combination in some ministries.  Most tend to emphasize smaller, relational congregations or groups.

Many Primitive Catholics are pacifists or believe in non-violent resistance, and strive for the separation of Church and State.  Some eschew jury duty, participation in elections, the taking of oaths, and other forms of civil involvement, seeing themselves as citizens of the Reign of God only.

Some Primitive Catholics hold to very specific, detailed doctrinal statements; others adopt the scriptures and creeds as boundaries of fellowship. Some within the movement credit David Bercot with introducing them to the possibility of living out a truly primitive faith. Bercot was, at one time, an Anglican who began a small congregation in Texas that existed along Primitive Catholic lines, but he has since become an Anabaptist. Nevertheless, Bercot's popular tape series "What the Early Christians Believed" remains in distribution among Primitive Catholics both for theological education and, in some places, for Christian formation.

While the Roman Catholic Church is not in communion with Primitive Catholic churches, Primitive Catholics are permitted under the Roman Catholic Church's 1983 Code of Canon Law to receive the sacraments of Holy Eucharist, Reconciliation, and Anointing of the Sick from Roman Catholic priests under Canon 844,3.
An ecclesiastical jurisdiction known as The Primitive Catholic Church lays claim to having spiritual and historical connections with the church of the first century. Another active jurisdiction claiming Apostolic lineage which self-identifies as part of the Primitive Catholic movement is the Libera Catholick Union, which is also active in the Christian vegetarianism movement. Their promoting of Christian Anarchism, their placing of pastoral concerns over alleged ancient Catholic customs and their historical understanding of Christianity as a continuation of the Asclepius cult has resulted in their sacramental validity being contested by some fundamentalists within the Independent Sacramental Movement. Many currently active jurisdictions offer Holy Orders to men, women and non-binary persons and to permit remarriage after divorce as well as same-sex marriages, which some claim was not part of primitive Catholicism in the past and should not be part of it today. Evidence for the ordination of women in early Christianity however has been found and published by several scholars, including [[Karen Jo Torjesen]].

See also 
 Evangelical Catholic
 Crypto-Protestantism

References

External links 
 https://web.archive.org/web/20070927231131/http://www.primitivecatholics.net/ Early Church quotes/articles/resources\
 The Primitive Catholic Church (Self-described Primitive Catholic jurisdiction)
  Celtic Ananaptist Communion (Descended in Apostolic lineage from The Primitive Catholic Church)
 Libera Catholick Union (Self-described Primitive Catholick & Christian Anarchist jurisdiction)

Christian movements